Kjellströmdalen is a valley at Spitsbergen, Svalbard. It has a length of about 27 kilometers, and forms the border between Nordenskiöld Land, Heer Land and Sabine Land. The valley is named after topographer Carl Johan Otto Kjellström. The valley debouches into Braganzavågen, a bay in the inner part of Van Mijenfjorden.

References

Valleys of Spitsbergen